Pokotylivka is an urban-type settlement in Kharkiv Raion of Kharkiv Oblast in Ukraine. It is a southwestern suburb of Kharkiv and is located on the left bank of the Udy, in the drainage basin of the Don. Pokotylivka belongs to Vysokyi settlement hromada, one of the hromadas of Ukraine. Population:

Economy

Transportation
Pokotylivka and Karachivka railway stations are both in Pokotylivka, on the railway connecting Kharkiv and Synelnykove via Lozova and Pavlohrad. There is significant passenger traffic through both stations.

The settlement has road access to Highway M18 connecting Kharkiv with Dnipro and Zaporizhzhia.

References

Urban-type settlements in Kharkiv Raion